Michael Napier CBE KC is a former president of the Law Society and was the Attorney-General's pro bono envoy between 2001 and 2015. He was also the Chairman Emeritus of Harbour Litigation Ltd. He was voted ‘Lawyer of the Year’ in the 2012 Legal Business awards for his 30 years as a senior partner with leading practice Irwin Mitchell. Now retired, we was also a director of Michael Napier Consulting Ltd.

Napier has been at the centre of the core changes in the delivery of legal services, law reform, access to justice issues and major cases, whilst also leading top 20 law firm Irwin Mitchell from which he retired in May 2012 after 40 years. He was also joint senior partner of Pannone Napier the law firm that handled many of the transport and product liability disasters of the 1980s/90's. He was the first solicitor advocate to appear before the European Court of Human Rights in 1981 in the mental health case Xv UK. He was one of the founding members of the Association of Personal Injury Lawyers in 1990, becoming Secretary (1990-1992), Vice President (1992-1994) and President from 1994 to 1996. 
 
In the business of law, Napier is well known as a successful achiever, broadcaster, commentator and author. In an interview following his award as ‘Lawyer of the Year 2012′ he was described by Legal Business as “A Man For All Seasons.”

When Napier was President of the Law Society in 2001 the Office of Fair Trading published its report on competition in the legal profession. This was followed by Sir David Clementi's report on regulation and the Government's white paper ‘Putting Consumers First’. The subsequent Legal Services Act 2007 introduced Alternative Business Structures (ABS) and established the Legal Services Board to which Napier was appointed in 2008.

Following the introduction of the Access to Justice Act in 1999 Napier was one of the initial appointees to the Civil Justice Council (CJC) on which he served for 10 years and co-authored a number of influential papers on the funding and costs of civil cases. As a consultant to the CJC he chaired the group that produced the Code of Conduct for third party litigation funders in 2011 and the CJC working party on contingency fees recommended by Lord Justice Jackson's report on civil litigation costs (to which Napier was an assessor) and now legalised by the Legal Aid Sentencing and Punishment of Offenders Act.

In the numerous reforms to the law and procedure of civil costs over the last 20 years Napier has been a central figure in helping others to understand and apply the ‘no win – no fee’ model. As an accredited (CEDR) mediator Napier employed ADR (alternative dispute resolution) techniques on behalf of the Civil Justice Council to placate the so-called ‘costs wars’ between insurers and claimant lawyers.

References

Year of birth missing (living people)
Living people
English lawyers